Blood Rites may refer to:

Blood Rites (Dresden Files), the 6th book in The Dresden Files, Jim Butcher's continuing series about wizard detective Harry Blackstone Copperfield Dresden
Blood Rites, 2012 novel by S. J. Rozan
Blood Rites (film), 1968 American horror film